Andrei Sergeyevich Krauchanka (also transliterated as Andrey Kravchenko) (born 4 January 1986) is a Belarusian decathlete. He was the silver medallist at the 2008 Beijing Olympics. His personal best score of 8617 points is the Belarusian record for the event. He also holds the national indoor record in the heptathlon with 6282 points.

Krauchanka was a talented combined events athlete from a young age: he broke the world youth best for the octathlon and was runner-up at the 2003 World Youth Championships in Athletics. He became the European and World Junior champion in the decathlon before emerging as a senior in 2007, when he won the bronze medal at the 2007 European Athletics Indoor Championships and set his best of 8617 to win the Hypo-Meeting.

Two silver medals on the global stage came in 2008, first at the 2008 IAAF World Indoor Championships and then at the Olympics in Beijing. Injuries affected his performances from 2009 to 2012, although he won bronze at the 2010 European Athletics Championships and gold at the 2011 European Athletics Indoor Championships during that time.

Career

Early career
Born in Myshanka in the Gomel Region, he grew up in the town of Pyetrykaw. Both his parents were involved in sports: his father Sergey was the military champion in combined track and field events when he was part of the Soviet Air Defence Forces, while his mother took part in figure skating, volleyball and athletics. His parents broke up when he was aged nine and, enduring financial difficulty, his mother encouraged him to take up athletics as a distraction. He performed to a high standard and went to the Olympic sports boarding school in Gomel as a teenager.

In 2000, he won the Belarusian youth title in the octathlon. International competitions followed and he broke the world youth record in the octathlon with a total of 6415 points in 2003. This mark was beaten soon after by Andrés Silva, who won at the 2003 World Youth Championships in Athletics, leaving Krauchanka with the silver medal. He also placed fifth in the long jump at that year's European Youth Olympic Festival. That year a period of training in Finland under Pavel Hamalainen, father of Eduard Hämäläinen, did not last and he returned to his original coach Ivan Gordienko.

Krauchanka moved into decathlon competitions in 2004 and, after setting a best of 7963 points to win the national junior title, he broke the championship record at the 2004 World Junior Championships in Athletics, collecting 8126 points with a series of personal bests. He broke the national junior record in heptathlon at 2005's Tallinn combined events meeting with 5929 points. He placed 13th at the high-profile 2005 Hypo-Meeting before winning his second major junior title at the 2005 European Athletics Junior Championships. In 2006, he again broke the 8000-point barrier, coming eleventh at the 2006 Hypo-Meeting, and placed third at the European Cup Combined Events.

First Olympic medal

Krauchanka set a personal heptathlon best at the Tallinn meet (5955) then won his first ever senior medal in the event at the 2007 European Athletics Indoor Championships, earning 6090 points and a bronze medal. The outdoor season saw him make a significant breakthrough as he won the 2007 Hypo-Meeting with a personal best of 8617 points. Among his competitors, he defeated the world record holder Roman Sebrle and reigning world champion Bryan Clay, both of whom praised the emerging Belarusian. He set personal bests in seven of the disciplines and was the outright winner in four of them. He failed to finish at the TNT – Fortuna Meeting but solidified his progress with a win at the 2007 European Athletics U23 Championships with 8492 points. The pressure of expectation affected him at the 2007 World Championships in Athletics as in the first 100 metres event he obviously false started twice, eliminating himself from the competition. He ended the year on a high note with a win at the Décastar meet.

The 2008 season started well for him with a Belarusian record in the heptathlon in Tallinn, winning the competition with a score of points. He bettered this with 6234 points at the 2008 IAAF World Indoor Championships, taking the silver medal behind Bryan Clay. Heading into the outdoor season he was more conservative in entering competitions and won the European Cup decathlon with 8585 points before going on to claim the silver medal in the event at the 2008 Beijing Olympics (again behind Clay). He retained his Décastar title in his last decathlon of the season and was the series winner of the IAAF Combined Events Challenge.

European medals
In spite of his successful 2008 season, he was unable to progress further in 2009 as he caught pneumonia and suffered throughout the season. He won the European Cup Combined Events title and placed tenth at the 2009 World Championships in Athletics, but his season's best of 8336 points was somewhat lower than the previous two years.

In 2010, he won the national universities title with a score of 6206 points for the heptathlon and went on the place fourth at the 2010 IAAF World Indoor Championships. Another major medal came at the 2010 European Athletics Championships, where his score of 8370 was enough for the decathlon bronze medal. At that competition, he looked set to be eliminated during the pole vault as his pole snapped mid-event. However, a Lithuanian rival Darius Draudvila allowed Krauchanka to borrow his implement, allowing the Belarusian to continue. The Belarusian team nominated Draudvila for the World Fair Play Award for his sportsmanship.

Krauchanka won another continental medal at the 2011 European Athletics Indoor Championships, improving his own national record to 6282 points to win the competition. However, he was carrying an ankle injury and was in pain during the events. He failed to finish at that year's TNT – Fortuna Meeting and missed the 2011 World Championships in Athletics. He was fifth at the Decastar in September. He performed well at the 2012 Belarusian indoor championships, becoming champion with 6205 points, but managed only sixth at the 2012 IAAF World Indoor Championships then failed to complete the decathlon at the Hypo-Meeting in May. This was his first and final outdoor appearance that year. His next competition came almost one year later, at the Multistars meeting, and he demonstrated a return to fitness with a winning score of 8390 points.

Personal life
He is married to fellow Belarusian athlete Yana Maksimava. Amid the forced repatriation and subsequent defection of Belarusian sprinter Krystsina Tsimanouskaya at the Summer Olympics in Tokyo in 2021, Maksimava announced that she and her husband Krauchanka would also not be returning to Belarus and would instead seek asylum in Germany, where the couple trains. Krauchanka had previously been detained in Belarus for taking part in protests against Alexander Lukashenko.

Competition record

References

External links

 

1986 births
Living people
People from Pietrykaw District
Belarusian decathletes
Athletes (track and field) at the 2008 Summer Olympics
Athletes (track and field) at the 2016 Summer Olympics
Olympic athletes of Belarus
Olympic silver medalists for Belarus
World Athletics Championships athletes for Belarus
European Athletics Championships medalists
Medalists at the 2008 Summer Olympics
Belarusian sportsmen
Belarusian defectors
Olympic silver medalists in athletics (track and field)
Sportspeople from Gomel Region